William Cockcroft DL is the former Chief Scout Commissioner of England and was director of the 21st World Scout Jamboree.

Cockcroft graduated from The Judd School in 1965, and the University of South Bank in 1970, majoring in Quantity Surveying.

He is Senior Partner of Sawyer Fisher Chartered Quantity Surveyors, which he joined in June 1965.

In 2008, Cockcroft was awarded the Bronze Wolf, the only distinction of the World Organization of the Scout Movement, awarded by the World Scout Committee for exceptional services to world Scouting, at the 38th World Scout Conference.

Footnotes

Scouting and Guiding in the United Kingdom
Living people
Deputy Lieutenants of Kent
Recipients of the Bronze Wolf Award
Year of birth missing (living people)
People educated at The Judd School